Kamiel Segers (24 December 1900 – 31 December 1964) was a Belgian racing cyclist. He rode in the 1927 Tour de France.

References

1900 births
1964 deaths
Belgian male cyclists
Place of birth missing